The 49th Illinois General Assembly met from 1915 to 1917. The first session convened on January 6, 1915 and adjourned sine die on June 30, 1915. The first special session convened on November 22, 1915 and adjourned sine die on May 10, 1916. The second special session convened on January 11, 1916 and adjourned sine die on February 14, 1916.

Barratt O'Hara of Chicago was the Lieutenant Governor of Illinois and thus ex officio President of the Senate. Stephen D. Canady of Hillsboro was President pro tempore of the Senate. David Shanahan of Chicago was the Speaker of the House of Representatives. Shanahan was made Temporary Speaker on February 16 after 68 ballots and was made full Speaker on February 17 on the first ballot. In the first session 1,548 bills were introduced, of which 293 became law.

Districts
Illinois was divided into 51 districts, each of which elected one Senator and three Representatives. Districts were last reapportioned in 1901 and would not be reapportioned again until 1947.

The counties of each district were as follows:
1st, 2nd, 3rd, 4th, 5th, 6th, 7th, 9th, 11th, 13th, 15th, 17th, 19th, 21st, 23rd, 25th, 27th, 29th, and 31st: Parts of Cook
8th: Lake, McHenry, and Boone
10th: Ogle and Winnebago
12th: Stephenson, Jo Daviess, and Carroll
14th: Kane and Kendall
16th: Marshall, Putnam, Livingston, and Woodford
18th: Peoria
20th: Grundy, Kankakee, and Iroquois
22nd: Vermillion and Edgar
24th: Champaign, Piatt, and Moultrie
26th: Ford and McLean
28th: DeWitt, Logan, and Macon
30th: Tazewell, Mason, Menard, Cass, Schuyler, and Brown
32nd: Hancock, McDonough, and Warren
33rd: Henderson, Mercer, and Rock Island
34th: Douglas, Coles, and Clark
35th: Whiteside, Lee, and DeKalb
36th: Adams, Pike, Calhoun, and Scott
37th: Henry, Stark, and Bureau
38th: Greene, Jersey, Macoupin, and Montgomery
39th: LaSalle
40th: Christian, Shelby, Cumberland, and Fayette
41st: DuPage and Will
42nd: Clinton, Marion, Clay, and Effingham
43rd: Knox and Fulton
44th: Jackson, Perry, Washington, Randolph, and Monroe
45th: Morgan and Sangamon
46th: Jefferson, Wayne, Richland, and Jasper
47th: Madison and Bond
48th: Hardin, Gallatin, White, Edwards, Wabash, Lawrence, and Crawford
49th: St. Clair
50th: Hamilton, Saline, Pope, Johnson, and Massac
51st: Franklin, Williamson, Union, Pulaski, and Alexander

Members

Senate
There were 51 senators.

Unless otherwise stated, "Chairman of the Committee on X" is abbreviated to "Chairman of X", etc.

House of Representatives
Prior to the Cutback Amendment in 1980, each district in the Illinois House of Representatives elected three members via cumulative voting. There were 79 Republicans, and the rest were mostly Democrats with a few Socialists and Progressives.

See also
List of Illinois state legislatures

Notes

References

Bibliography

1915 in Illinois
1916 in Illinois
Illinois legislative sessions
Illinois
Illinois